Kholmsky (masculine), Kholmskaya (feminine), or Kholmskoye (neuter) may refer to:

 Kholmskaya (or Kholmsky), a rural locality (a stanitsa) in Krasnodar Krai, Russia
 Kholmsky District, several districts in Russia
 Daniil Kholmsky (died 1493), Russian military leader
 Vasily Kholmsky (1460s–1524), Russian military leader
 Kholmsky Urban Okrug, a municipal formation which Kholmsky District in Sakhalin Oblast, Russia is incorporated as
 Kholmskoye Urban Settlement, a municipal formation which the town of district significance of Kholm in Kholmsky District of Novgorod Oblast, Russia is incorporated as

See also
Kholm (disambiguation)
Kholmsk, a town in Russia